Sennely is a commune in the Loiret department in north-central France. Sennely was carefully studied by Professor Bouchard and the subject of a chapter in "After the Black Death."

See also
Communes of the Loiret department

References

Communes of Loiret